John Burns Buxton (31 October 1933 – 3 October 2007) was a New Zealand rugby union player. A flanker, Buxton represented Manawatu, Canterbury, Otago and Auckland at a provincial level, and was a member of the New Zealand national side, the All Blacks, in 1955 and 1956. He played two games for the All Blacks, both of them test matches. He died on October 3, 2007, four weeks before his 74th birthday.

References

1933 births
2007 deaths
People educated at Takapuna Grammar School
Lincoln University (New Zealand) alumni
New Zealand rugby union players
New Zealand international rugby union players
Rugby union flankers
Manawatu rugby union players
Canterbury rugby union players
Otago rugby union players
Auckland rugby union players
Rugby union players from Auckland